The following highways in Virginia have been known as State Route 12:
State Route 12, 1918–1933, originally Abingdon to Suffolk, now mainly U.S. Route 58#Virginia
State Route 12, 1933 – mid-1930s, now U.S. Route 220 in Virginia from Troutville to Clifton Forge
State Route 12, 1935–1953, now U.S. Route 340 in Virginia from Greenville to Berryville